Musaabad Rural District is a rural district (dehestan) in the Central District of Dehaqan County, Isfahan Province, Iran. At the 2006 census, its population was 5,989, consisting of 1,732 families.  The rural district has eight villages.

References 

Rural Districts of Isfahan Province
Dehaqan County